Dementia 13 (alternately titled Haloran Manor) is a 2017 American horror film directed by Richard LeMay, and starring Julia Campanelli, Ana Isabelle, Marianne Noscheze, Channing Pickett, and Christian Ryan. It is a remake of 1963's Dementia 13. As of February 2022, it is the last film released by Chiller Films.

Plot 
The plot revolves around a vengeful ghost, a mysterious killer, and a family in a night of terror at a secluded estate.

Cast 
 Julia Campanelli as Gloria Haloran 
 Ana Isabelle as Louise Haloran
 Marianne Noscheze as Billy Haloran 
 Channing Pickett as Rose Haloran 
 Christian Ryan as John Haloran 
 Anthony Salvador Lewis as Father Matos 
 Steve Polites as Dale
 Ben van Berkum as Kane
 Roland Sands as Arthur

Release

Theatrical release 
The film was released on October 6, 2017.

Reception 
Reviews for the film have been mixed. Matt Boiselle writing for Dread Central gave the film two and a half stars saying "Overall, this version of a film that back in the day tried very hard to stand alone unfortunately doesn’t do enough to raise itself up from a seated position. If you’re in the mood to compare and contrast the old with the new, then by all means give this one a watch, but I saw it as a singular view and not much more." John DeFore with The Hollywood Reporter called the film "a fairly mild thriller that, in the crowded horror marketplace, will rely on its pedigree for most of its appeal."

Kimber Myers of the Los Angeles Times enjoyed the film. "A remake of Francis Ford Coppola’s early horror film Dementia 13 likely wasn’t on anyone’s wish list, but this update from Richard LeMay is an enjoyably cheap little gift...Beyond its style, Dementia 13 doesn’t innovate, but it’s a capably made indie that should please genre fans searching for a haunted diversion."

References

External links 
 
 

2017 horror films
American horror thriller films
Films about dysfunctional families
Horror film remakes
Remakes of American films
2010s English-language films
2010s American films